Christian Heinrich Heineken or Heinecken (February 6, 1721 – June 27, 1725), also known as "the infant scholar of Lübeck", was a German child prodigy who lived only to the age of four.

Life
He was born in Lübeck, Germany, the son of Paul Heinecken, a painter and architect, and Catharina Elisabeth Heinecken, an artist and alchemist. His brother, Carl Heinrich von Heineken, became an art historian and collector and was later knighted.

It is said that when he was ten months old, he could speak German. He read the Pentateuch at age one, and between the ages of two and three, he read the Old and New Testament in Latin. When he was three years old, he was said to have recited his own History of Denmark when visiting the King of Denmark. Also at three, he testified in court to the murder of his friend, another boy named Reid. He died at age four of celiac disease. He was breastfed until close to his death, which was very likely caused by the ingestion of grain products.

While his exploits may seem hard to believe, they are relatively well documented. In 1726, his tutor (a man named Schöneich) published a study of Christian entitled The Life, Deeds, Travels and Death of the Child of Lübeck. Immanuel Kant wrote an essay about the child calling him an "ingenium praecox" (someone "prematurely clever").

See also 
Child prodigy
Genius
Gifted education
Intellectual giftedness

References

Other sources 
 Barlow, F. Mental prodigies. New York: Philosophical Library, 1952.
 Long, G. (ed.). ''Penny Cyclopaedia. Society for the Diffusion of Useful Knowledge, 1838.
 Guido Guerzoni: The Wonderboy of Lübeck. The extraordinary life of Christian Heinrich Heinecken (English Edition). Turin 2006.

1721 births
1725 deaths
People from Lübeck
Childhood
German folklore